Hearts and Bones is a television drama series, about a group of friends who move from Coventry to London, starring Damian Lewis, Dervla Kirwan, Sarah Parish and Andrew Scarborough which aired on BBC One in 2000. A second series followed in 2001. It featured the first screen appearance of Michael Fassbender.

The complete DVD set was released in 2007.

Cast

Main cast
 Damian Lewis, Mark Rose (Series 1)
 Andrew Scarborough, Michael Owen
 Dervla Kirwan, Emma Rose
 Hugo Speer, Richard Rose
 Amanda Holden, Louise Slaney
 Sarah Parish, Amanda Thomas
 Rose Keegan, Sinead Creagh

References

External links 

2000s British drama television series
2000 British television series debuts
2001 British television series endings
BBC television dramas
Television shows set in London
Television series by ITV Studios
Television shows produced by Meridian Broadcasting
English-language television shows